Anarusuk Island is an uninhabited island in Avannaata municipality in northwestern Greenland.

Geography 
Anarusuk Island is located in Tasiusaq Bay, in the north-central part of Upernavik Archipelago, on the shores of the inner reaches of Kangerlussuaq Icefjord, which in the northeast separates it from Giesecke Glacier on the mainland of Greenland.

The island is separated from Nuuluk Island in the northwest by a small Ikerasaarsuk channel, from Aappilattoq Island in the west by a small channel of the same name, and by the inner waterways of Tasiusaq Bay from Aukarnersuaq Island in the southeast and Qaqaarissorsuaq Island in the south.

Coastline 
The coastline of the island is developed, with many inlets indenting the coastline in the west.

Promontories

References

Anarusuk
Uninhabited islands of Greenland
Tasiusaq Bay
Islands of the Upernavik Archipelago